Köhnə Alvadı (also, Këgna Alvady and Staryye Alvady) is a village and municipality in the Masally Rayon of Azerbaijan.  It has a population of 3,496.

References 

Populated places in Masally District